Sentrin-specific protease 7 is an enzyme that in humans is encoded by the SENP7 gene.

References

Further reading

External links